The Sri Lanka cricket team toured Australia in February 2022 to play five Twenty20 International (T20I) matches. In May 2021, Cricket Australia confirmed the fixtures for the tour. In January 2022, Cricket Australia updated the tour schedule, to reduce the risks of COVID-19 by minimising travel across the country.

Australia won the opening match by 20 runs, after a rain delay reduced Sri Lanka's innings to 19 overs. In January 2022, the International Cricket Council made changes to the T20I playing conditions, including an in-match penalty for a slow over rate. If the team who is fielding does not start to bowl their final over in the allocated time, they will only be allowed to have four fielders outside the inner circle, and not five. In the second T20I match of the series, Sri Lanka became the first team to incur the new penalty, after not bowling their overs in time. The match ended in a tie, with Australia winning the Super Over. Australia won the third T20I by six wickets, winning the series with two matches to play. Australia also won the fourth match by six wickets, taking a 4–0 lead in the series. Sri Lanka won the final T20I match by five wickets with Australia winning the series 4–1.

Squads

Ahead of the tour, Australia added Daniel Sams to their T20I squad, replacing Travis Head. Head played in the 2021–22 Sheffield Shield season, before he joined the team for the final T20Is in Melbourne. On 8 February 2022, Sri Lanka's Kusal Mendis tested positive for COVID-19, ruling him out of the first two matches of the series. In the second T20I match, Australia's Steven Smith suffered a concussion and was ruled out of the rest of the series. Prior to the third T20I, Sri Lanka's Wanindu Hasaranga also tested positive for COVID-19, and was ruled out of the fixture.

T20I series

1st T20I

2nd T20I

3rd T20I

4th T20I

5th T20I

Statistics

Most runs

Most wickets

Australian cricket team in Sri Lanka in 2022

References

External links
 Series home at ESPN Cricinfo

2022 in Australian cricket
2022 in Sri Lankan cricket
2021–22 Australian cricket season
International cricket competitions in 2021–22
Sri Lankan cricket tours of Australia